The 1984 season of the Venezuelan Primera División, the top category of Venezuelan football, was played by 11 teams. The national champions were Deportivo Táchira.

Results

First stage

Final Stage

External links
Venezuela 1984 season at RSSSF

Ven
Venezuelan Primera División seasons
Prim